Wireless refers to the transfer of information signals without using wires.  The term may also refer to:

Electronic communications 
 Wireless LAN, a wireless local-area computer network
 Wireless network
 WiMAX, a wireless wide-area computer network
 Bluetooth, a wireless system for data communications between devices
 Wireless phone, a less-often used name for a mobile (cellular) phone
 Wireless, former British and Commonwealth term for a radio receiver
 Wireless telegraphy, an early form of radio technology

Other electronics 
 Wireless charging, or inductive charging, the transfer of energy through electromagnetic induction

Music 
 Wireless (band), a Canadian rock band from the 1970s and 1980s
 Wireless (Wireless album), 1976 debut album by the band Wireless
 Wireless (Threshold album), 2003 album by the band Threshold
 Wireless Festival, a music festival held every year since 2005 in Hyde Park, London
 "Wireless", a song from the 1996 Cardiacs album Sing to God

Books 
 Wireless: The Essential Charles Stross, a 2009 science fiction collection by Charles Stross
 "Wireless" (short story), a 1902 short story by Rudyard Kipling
 "Wireless" (Christie short story), a short story by Agatha Christie